Omophron is a genus of ground beetle (Carabidae), the only extant genus in the subfamily Omophroninae. It is mostly distributed in the Northern Hemisphere with the southern border running through Guatemala and Hispaniola in Americas, South Africa and Madagascar in Africa, Malaysia and Philippines in Asia.

Species
These 69 species belong to the genus Omophron:

Subgenus Omophron Latreille, 1802
 Omophron aequale A.Morawitz, 1863
 Omophron affine Bänninger, 1918
 Omophron africanum Rousseau, 1908
 Omophron amandae Valainis, 2010
 Omophron americanum Dejean, 1831
 Omophron axillare Chaudoir, 1868
 Omophron baenningeri Dupuis, 1912
 Omophron bicolor Andrewes, 1919
 Omophron brettinghamae Pascoe, 1860
 Omophron capense Gory, 1833
 Omophron capicola Chaudoir, 1868
 Omophron chelys Andrewes, 1921
 Omophron clavareaui Rousseau, 1900
 Omophron congoense Delève, 1924
 Omophron dentatum LeConte, 1852
 Omophron dissimile Delève, 1924
 Omophron distinctum Bänninger, 1918
 Omophron gemmeum Andrewes, 1921
 Omophron ghesquierei Delève, 1924
 Omophron gilae LeConte, 1852
 Omophron gratum Chaudoir, 1868
 Omophron grossum Casey, 1909
 Omophron guttatum Chaudoir, 1868
 Omophron hainanense Tian & Deuve, 2000
 Omophron interruptum Chaudoir, 1868
 Omophron labiatum (Fabricius, 1801)
 Omophron limbatum (Fabricius, 1777)
 Omophron lunatum Bänninger, 1918
 Omophron luzonicum Darlington, 1967
 Omophron maculosum Chaudoir, 1850
 Omophron madagascariense Chaudoir, 1850
 Omophron mexicanum Dupuis, 1912
 Omophron minutum Dejean, 1831
 Omophron nepalense Valainis, 2013
 Omophron nitidum LeConte, 1847
 Omophron oberthueri Gestro, 1892
 Omophron obliteratum G.Horn, 1870
 Omophron oblongiusculum Chevrolat, 1835
 Omophron ovale G.Horn, 1870
 Omophron parvum Tian & Deuve, 2000
 Omophron piceopictum Wrase, 2002
 Omophron pictum (Wiedemann, 1823)
 Omophron picturatum Boheman, 1860
 Omophron porosum Chaudoir, 1868
 Omophron pseudotestudo Tian & Deuve, 2000
 Omophron riedeli Emden, 1932
 Omophron robustum G.Horn, 1870
 Omophron rotundatum Chaudoir, 1852
 Omophron saigonense Chaudoir, 1868
 Omophron severini Dupuis, 1911
 Omophron smaragdus Andrewes, 1921
 Omophron solidum Casey, 1897
 Omophron sphaericum Chevrolat, 1835
 Omophron stictum Andrewes, 1933
 Omophron striaticeps Gestro, 1888
 Omophron tessellatum Say, 1823
 Omophron testudo Andrewes, 1919
 Omophron virens Andrewes, 1929
 Omophron vittatum (Wiedemann, 1823)
 Omophron yunnanense Tian & Deuve, 2000
Subgenus Phrator Semenov, 1922
 Omophron alluaudi Dupuis, 1913
 Omophron barsevskisi Valainis, 2011
 Omophron depressum Klug, 1853
 Omophron ethiopiense Valanis, 2016
 Omophron grandidieri (Alluaud, 1899)
 Omophron multiguttatum Chaudoir, 1850
 Omophron schoutedeni Delève, 1924
 Omophron variegatum Olivier, 1812
 Omophron vittulatum Fairmaire, 1894

References

External links
 

Carabidae genera